Dragash Point (‘Nos Dragash’ \'nos 'dra-gash\) is the rocky point forming the south extremity of Dee Island in the South Shetland Islands, Antarctica.

The point is named after the settlement of Dragash Voyvoda in Northern Bulgaria.

Location
British mapping in 1968, Chilean in 1971, Argentine in 1980, and Bulgarian in 2005 and 2009.

Maps
 L.L. Ivanov et al. Antarctica: Livingston Island and Greenwich Island, South Shetland Islands. Scale 1:100000 topographic map. Sofia: Antarctic Place-names Commission of Bulgaria, 2005.
 L.L. Ivanov. Antarctica: Livingston Island and Greenwich, Robert, Snow and Smith Islands. Scale 1:120000 topographic map.  Troyan: Manfred Wörner Foundation, 2009.   (Updated second edition 2010.  )

References
 Dragash Point. SCAR Composite Antarctic Gazetteer
 Bulgarian Antarctic Gazetteer. Antarctic Place-names Commission. (details in Bulgarian, basic data in English)

External links
 Dragash Point. Copernix satellite image

Headlands of Greenwich Island
Bulgaria and the Antarctic